

317001–317100 

|-bgcolor=#f2f2f2
| colspan=4 align=center | 
|}

317101–317200 

|-bgcolor=#f2f2f2
| colspan=4 align=center | 
|}

317201–317300 

|-bgcolor=#f2f2f2
| colspan=4 align=center | 
|}

317301–317400 

|-bgcolor=#f2f2f2
| colspan=4 align=center | 
|}

317401–317500 

|-id=452
| 317452 Wurukang ||  || Wu Rukang (1916–2006), an academician of Chinese Academy of Sciences, was a pioneer in Chinese Physical anthropology and paleoanthropology. He established the new academic field of neo-anthropology. || 
|}

317501–317600 

|-bgcolor=#f2f2f2
| colspan=4 align=center | 
|}

317601–317700 

|-bgcolor=#f2f2f2
| colspan=4 align=center | 
|}

317701–317800 

|-id=715
| 317715 Guydetienne ||  || Guy Detienne (born 1950), a Belgian amateur astronomer. || 
|}

317801–317900 

|-id=809
| 317809 Marot ||  || Clément Marot (1496–1544), a French poet of the Renaissance and the official poet of King Francois I. || 
|}

317901–318000 

|-id=917
| 317917 Jodelle ||  || Etienne Jodelle (1532–1573), a French dramatist and poet. || 
|}

References 

317001-318000